Hugo Hernán González (born 9 March 1992) is an Argentine professional footballer who plays as a forward for Sport Club São Paulo.

Career

Richmond Kickers
In February 2020, González was signed by the Richmond Kickers of USL League One. He made his debut for the club on 17 April 2021 against New England Revolution II.

References

External links
 
 

1992 births
Living people
Club Atlético Atlas footballers
Club Comunicaciones footballers
Esporte Clube Internacional players
Club Atlético Douglas Haig players
Orense S.C. players
Deportes Magallanes footballers
Juventud Unida Universitario players
Richmond Kickers players
Primera B Metropolitana players
Torneo Federal A players
Ecuadorian Serie B players
Primera B de Chile players
USL League One players
Argentine footballers
Argentine expatriate footballers
Association football forwards
Sportspeople from Mendoza, Argentina
Argentine expatriate sportspeople in the United States
Expatriate soccer players in the United States
Argentine expatriate sportspeople in Brazil
Expatriate footballers in Brazil
Argentine expatriate sportspeople in Chile
Expatriate footballers in Chile
Expatriate footballers in Ecuador
Argentine expatriate sportspeople in Ecuador